Selâhattin Köseoğlu also known as Çolak Selâhattin, Hüseyin Selâhattin Bey (1882 – October 6, 1949) was a military officer of the Ottoman Army and the Turkish Army. He was also a politician of the Republic of Turkey.

Medals and decorations
Medal of Independence with Red-Green Ribbon

See also
List of recipients of the Medal of Independence with Red-Green Ribbon (Turkey)

Sources

1882 births
1949 deaths
Military personnel from Istanbul
Ottoman Military Academy alumni
Ottoman Military College alumni
Ottoman Army officers
Ottoman military personnel of the Balkan Wars
Ottoman military personnel of World War I
Turkish Army officers
Turkish people of the Turkish War of Independence
Deputies of Mersin
Recipients of the Medal of Independence with Red-Green Ribbon (Turkey)